T Crucis is a star in the constellation Crux. A Cepheid variable, its apparent magnitude ranges from 6.32 to 6.83 over 6.73331 days. It is a yellow-white supergiant that pulsates between spectral types F6Ib and G2Ib. The radius is 55 times  that of the Sun.

References

Crux (constellation)
Classical Cepheid variables
Crucis, T
Durchmusterung objects
107447
F-type supergiants
060529
G-type supergiants